Ilya Andreyevich Druzhinin (born 23 April 1998) is a Russian swimmer. He competed in the men's 1500 metre freestyle event at the 2016 Summer Olympics.

References

External links
 

1998 births
Living people
Russian male swimmers
Olympic swimmers of Russia
Swimmers at the 2016 Summer Olympics
Swimmers at the 2020 Summer Olympics
European Games competitors for Russia
Swimmers at the 2015 European Games
Russian male freestyle swimmers
Sportspeople from Volgograd
20th-century Russian people
21st-century Russian people